Chambéry Savoie Football is a French association football club based in Chambéry, in the Auvergne-Rhône-Alpes region in eastern France. It was founded in 1925 as Chambéry Football Club, and merged in 1942 with Chamberien Associate Sportif to become Stade Olympique de Chambéry. In 2015, after a liquidation event, it was renamed Chambéry Savoie Football.

History
Chambéry was founded in 1925. They are based in the town of Chambéry and their home stadium is the Stade Jaques Level, but they play most of their games at the Stade Municipal in the town. As of the 2019–20 season, the club plays in the Championnat National 3. In the 2010–11 season, Chambéry became the first amateur club in Coupe de France history to defeat three Ligue 1 clubs (Monaco, Brest, Sochaux), before losing in the quarterfinals.

Current squad

References

External links
Official website 

Chambery
Sport in Chambéry
Football clubs in Auvergne-Rhône-Alpes
1925 establishments in France
Chambéry SF